Haliotis virginea, Virgin Paua, is a species of edible sea snail, a marine gastropod mollusk in the family Haliotidae, the abalones.

Description
The size of the shell varies between 30 mm and 75 mm.

Subspecies
 Haliotis virginea crispata Gould, 1847
 Haliotis virginea huttoni Filhol, 1880
 Haliotis virginea morioria Powell, 1938
 Haliotis virginea stewartae Jones & Owen, 2004

Distribution
This marine species is endemic to New Zealand.

Human use 

Haliotis virginea and two other Haliotis species are known as "paua" in New Zealand and are a restricted food source.

References 

 Geiger D.L. & Poppe G.T. (2000). A Conchological Iconography: The family Haliotidae. Conchbooks, Hackenheim Germany. 135pp  83pls. 
 Geiger D.L. & Owen B. (2012) Abalone: Worldwide Haliotidae. Hackenheim: Conchbooks. viii + 361 pp.
 Jones M. & Owen B. 2004. Description of Haliotis virginea stewartae new subspecies (Gastropoda) from subantarctic islands of New Zealand. Of Sea & Shore, 26(2): 81-85

External links 

 photos
 

virginea
Molluscs of the Pacific Ocean
Gastropods of New Zealand
Endemic fauna of New Zealand
Gastropods described in 1791
Taxa named by Johann Friedrich Gmelin
Endemic molluscs of New Zealand